McIntosh County is the name of several counties in the United States:

 McIntosh County, Georgia
 McIntosh County, North Dakota
 McIntosh County, Oklahoma